Yordan Frómeta (Gendry), is a Cuban amateur boxer who has won U17 and junior world titles at featherweight.

Career
At the U17 world championships 2005 he edged out Onur Sipal in the final. At the National senior championships 2006 he lost his semifinal to Luis Franco. At the World junior championships 2006 he defeated Hamza Kramou and narrowly beat US-American Sadam Ali and won again. In 2007 he moved up to lightweight but was outclassed by dominant 2005 world champion Yordenis Ugás.

See also
Rosniel Iglesias

References

External links
U17 World Championships
2006 national title
junior world title 2006

Year of birth missing (living people)
Lightweight boxers
Living people
Cuban male boxers